Melbourne High School or Mel-Hi is a public secondary school located in Melbourne, Florida, United States and operated by Brevard Public Schools.

History 

The original high school was built on New Haven Avenue in 1919. It is now the Henegar Center.
In 1948, the old Eau Gallie High School on Pineapple Avenue closed. Their former students were bused to Melbourne High.
Rotary International chartered their first Interact service club ever with 23 students at the school in 1960.

In about 1953, Zora Neale Hurston staged the school's first integrated concert, though the school had not yet been integrated itself.

The school experienced race riots during the period of integration from 1969 to 1976.

The school's International Baccalaureate Prep program started in 1981.

In 2009 Melbourne High School became a magnet school which includes an Academy of Business and Finance. This is a National Academy Foundation program.

Academics
The school has an Academy of Business and Finance ("The Academy"), International Baccalaureate program, Advanced Placement program and dual enrollment.

Athletics 
The school's mascot is the bulldog. The school's rivals are Satellite High School, Eau Gallie High School, and Palm Bay High School.

Recognition 
 Football 2A 1966 State Champions.
 Girls' Soccer State Champions 1987, 2009, 2010 5A, and 2013 4A. 
 Boys' Soccer 1994 5A State Champions, 2009 & 2010 6A State Champions, 2014 4A State Champions
 Boys' Cross country won first in the state 4A Championships in 2007 and 2008
 Girls' Cross country won first in the state 4A Championships in 2006

Campus 
In 2008, the school installed an artificial turf football field and a new gym.
In 2008, the school board started construction on a new eight laboratory science building, which was completed in early 2009.

Notable people

Alumni 

Bruce Bochy (1973) - manager of the Texas Rangers (baseball)
Lee Nelson (1973) - former NFL player with the St. Louis/Arizona Cardnals 
Mickey Zofko (1967) - former NFL player with Detroit Lions and New York Giants
Brian Bollinger (1987) - former NFL player with the San Francisco 49ers

 Jorja Fox (1986) - actress 
 Dena Grayson (1988) - biochemical researcher
Kristin Grubka (2007) - soccer player
Darrell Hammond (1973) -American actor, stand-up comedian and impressionist

 David J. Lane (1978) - U.S. Ambassador 
 Bill Nelson (1959) - U.S. Senator from Florida and Payload Specialist on Space Shuttle Columbia mission STS-61-C 
 Allison Schroeder (1997) - Academy Award nominated screenwriter of Hidden Figures.
 Robbin Thompson (1967) - singer-songwriter

Staff 

 Joseph M. Acaba, astronaut, who taught science 1999–2000.

References

External links 

Buildings and structures in Melbourne, Florida
Brevard Public Schools
Educational institutions established in 1926
High schools in Brevard County, Florida
Public high schools in Florida
Magnet schools in Florida
1926 establishments in Florida